In Concert is a live album by American jazz pianist John Hicks recorded in 1984 at various locations around San Francisco and released on the Theresa label in 1986. The 1993 Evidence CD reissue added two bonus tracks.

Reception
Allmusic awarded the album 4 stars calling it "An excellent example of Hicks' playing abilities and an enjoyable set of modern hard bop".

Track listing
 "Some Other Time/Some Other Spring"  (Leonard Bernstein, Betty Comden, Adolph Green/Arthur Herzog, Jr., Irene Kitchings) - 7:24		
 "Paul's Pal" (Sonny Rollins) - 13:17		
 "Pas de Trois (Dance for Three)" (Paul Arslanian) - 7:45		
 "Say It (Over and over Again)" (Frank Loesser, Jimmy McHugh) - 4:27		
 "Soul Eyes" (Mal Waldron) - 8:10		
 "Take the Coltrane" (Duke Ellington) - 8:29 Bonus track on CD reissue		
 "Oblivion" (Bud Powell) - 3:39 Bonus track on CD reissue

Personnel
John Hicks - piano
Walter Booker - bass
Idris Muhammad - drums 
Bobby Hutcherson - vibraphone (track 2) 
Elise Wood - flute (track 4)

References

Theresa Records live albums
John Hicks (jazz pianist) live albums
1986 live albums